Nijeholtwolde is a  village in Weststellingwerf in the province of Friesland, the Netherlands. It had a population of around 183 in 2017.

The village was first mentioned in 1320 as Nieholtwolt, and means "new low-lying wood". Nije (new) has been added to distinguish from Oldeholtwolde. The church of Nijeholtwolde was demolished around 1700. There were no funds to rebuilt it, and a bell tower was constructed instead. The tower has been restored in 1982.

In 1840, Nijeholtwolde was home to 225 people.

References

External links

Geography of Weststellingwerf
Populated places in Friesland